Squirrels is a program for four to six year old infant children operated by The Scout Association in the United Kingdom. The program was launched in September 2021.

Squirrels is a program with aspects imitating the Scouts for much younger, infant children. Squirrels make a simple promise to suit members' young ages, wear neckerchiefs in group colours, have award badges, short meetings with early finishing times and are taught moral lessons through indirect means. A group of Squirrels is called a Drey which is run locally by a Scout Group. After reaching the age of six, a Squirrel can move on to Beavers.

History

Northern Ireland Squirrel Association
The Northern Ireland Squirrel Association was an independent association that operated as a feeder organisation for some Scout Groups in Northern Ireland from the late 1990s. Like the Little Brothers and Beavers in Northern Ireland before them, the Squirrel Association provided a model for the Scout Association's later programs for younger and younger children.

Dreys which were part of the Northern Ireland Squirrel Association will be merged into local Scout Groups.

2019—2021 pilot and launch
The Scout Association launched its pilot after competition from Girlguiding UK's Rainbow Guides which, since 1987, accepted members from age 5 (4 in Northern Ireland). Following the Scout Association's launch of Squirrels, Girlguiding UK reduced their entrance age to four in October 2021.

From 2019, the Scout Association piloted a program, initially under the name Hedgehogs, as a way to increase participation, opportunities for volunteers, and initially targeted black, Asian and minority ethnic (BAME) communities. The trials included some led by parents, schools and other early years settings and by the Scout Association itself. The trials were considered successful in reaching parts of the population previously underserved by the Scout Association and 60% of participants had no previous involvement with the Scout Association before the pilot. The impact of the COVID-19 pandemic in the United Kingdom on wellbeing and development of young children, particularly in more deprived communities, influenced the decision to launch the program. The Squirrels program was launched on 9 September 2021. The name, Squirrels, was influenced by the children's TV show Hey Duggee and the site of Robert Baden-Powell's 1907 Brownsea Island camp having a thriving colony of red squirrels. At launch, in September 2021, there were 200 Squirrel dreys across the United Kingdom and, by the end of November 2021, there were more than 350 registered.

The Scout Association piloted its first weekend camp for squirrels in October 2021. Squirrels participated in services for Remembrance Day in November.

Program

The Squirrels program includes activities, games, exploring nature, visits and residential experiences with a focus on children "having outdoor adventures, making friends and learning" the program's founders emphasise the importance of experiences in child development to the age of five years. Squirrels can earn badges.

Squirrels meetings may "start with a welcome ceremony, then... storytime and activities linked to that" and "lots of craft, music, singing and there’s a real push to have community involvement, getting them involved in projects helping others." Children at a Squirrels launch event made "their own campfires using recyclable cups and tissue paper, a scout activity for small people."

Organisation
The core age range for Squirrels is between four and six years of age which can be flexible in order to meet inclusion requirements.

Squirrels are attached to local Scout groups, led by a Squirrel leader often supplemented by basically trained assistants, regular helpers (14-18 year old Young Leaders) and occasional helpers who may be parents assisting as part of a rota. A group of Squirrels, referred to as a drey, usually has no more than 24 children and meet early in the evening for 45 minutes to an hour.

Promise
Squirrels make a promise when they join the program, normally in a ceremony in front of family members. The Squirrel promise used for Christians and Jews is:

I promise to do my best,
To be kind and helpful,
and to love God.

Muslims can replace the word God with Allah. Buddhists and Hindus can make no mention of a deity while those of no faith can substitute the word God with 'our world'. Squirrels are not Scouts as they do not make the Scout Promise and the Scout Law is not mentioned in the Squirrel promise but the program aims to begin teaching participants the ideals of the Scout Association through informal means such as games and stories.

Awards and badges
Squirrels can gain awards and badges. These include twelve activity badges for specific skills and experiences, four challenge awards and a top award, the Chief Scout's Acorn Award. Squirrels can also earn staged activity badges which chart the development of specific skills.

Visual identity

Uniform
Squirrels have a uniform consisting of a red jumper and a neckerchief in group colours. This style is based on the appeal of primary colours to young children as well as being designed to help keep track of participants.

Logo and branding
The Squirrels logo consists of the word 'Squirrels' in red, with the initial 'S' forming a tail of a squirrel. 

The logo and other branding were modelled on the wildlife of Brownsea Island where Robert Baden-Powell held his 1907 Brownsea Island camp and also drew inspiration from fashion brands. The branding was designed by Supple Studios for the Scout Association.

See also

 The Scout Association - owner, operator and parent organisation of the Squirrels program.
 Beaver Scouts (The Scout Association) - The Scout Association's age program that follows Squirrels.
 Age Groups in Scouting and Guiding
 Rainbows (Girl Guides) - competing Girlguiding program targeting similar age group.
 The Fairly OddParents- had a parody of scouts witch Timmy Tunner goes to called the Squirrel Scouts, witch first appeared in the 8th short back in 2000 over 21 years before the official introduction of Squirrel Scouts in the real world.

References

External links
 Official Squirrels website

The Scout Association
Early childhood education in the United Kingdom
Squirrels in popular culture